Wilma De Angelis (born 8 April 1930) is a popular Italian singer and TV presenter. She is also very famous for her talk show A pranzo con Wilma, and her cooking abilities. She hosted the cooking show Telemenù from 1978 through 1987 on Telemontecarlo, and has authored two cook books.

Sanremo Music Festival participations 
1959 – "Per tutta la vita" (Testa–Spotti), coupled with Jula de Palma
1959 – "Nessuno" (De Simone–Capotosti), coupled with Betty Curtis
1960 – "Quando vien la sera" (Testa–Rossi), coupled with Joe Sentieri
1960 – "Splende l'arcobaleno" (Di Ceglie–Tumminelli), coupled with Gloria Christian
1961 – "Patatina" (Meccia–Migliacci), coupled with Gianni Meccia
1962 – "I colori della felicità" (Sciorilli–Ranzato) coupled with Tanya
1962 – "Lumicini rossi" (Fabor–Testoni), coupled with Lucia Altieri
1963 – "Non costa niente" (Sciorilli–Calcagno), coupled with Johnny Dorelli
1963 – "Se passerai di qui" (Testoni–Camis), coupled with Flo Sandon's

Sources
 Joseph Baroni, Dizionario della televisione, Raffaello Cortina Editore, 2005; ISBN 88-7078-972-1.
 Antonio Sciotti, Enciclopedia del Festival della Canzone Napoletana 1952-1981, ed. Luca Torre, 2011.

1930 births
Living people
Singers from Milan
Italian women singers
Italian chefs